WTLL-LP was a Christian radio station licensed to Zanesville, Ohio, broadcasting on 98.9 MHz FM. The station was last owned by In His Service, Inc.

The station's owners surrendered WTLL-LP's license to the Federal Communications Commission on January 11, 2023, who cancelled it the same day.

References

External links

TLL-LP
TLL-LP
Radio stations established in 2007
Radio stations disestablished in 2023
2007 establishments in Ohio
2023 disestablishments in Ohio
Defunct radio stations in the United States
Defunct religious radio stations in the United States
TLL-LP